James J. Callanan (1842 – June 8, 1900) was a cooper, merchant and political figure in Newfoundland. He represented St. John's West in the Newfoundland and Labrador House of Assembly from 1882 to 1889 and from 1897 to 1900 as a Liberal.

He was born in St. John's. In 1877, he established a retail and wholesale grocery business. Callanan was president of the local Mechanics' Institute from 1876 to 1890. He ran unsuccessfully in 1889 as a member of the Reform party and then ran unsuccessfully as a Conservative in 1893. Callanan served in the city council for St. John's from 1894 to 1898. He died in St. John's in 1900.

References 
 

Members of the Newfoundland and Labrador House of Assembly
1842 births
1900 deaths
Newfoundland Colony people
People from Newfoundland (island)